Diet Rite is an American brand of no-calorie soft drinks that was originally distributed by the RC Cola company.

History
 
Diet Rite was introduced in 1958 and initially released as a dietetic product, but was introduced nationwide and marketed to the general public as a healthful beverage in 1962. The original formula was sweetened with cyclamate and saccharin. After cyclamate was banned in 1969, it was removed from the product. NutraSweet brand aspartame was added upon its introduction to the market, and in 1987 the saccharin was replaced entirely with the complete elimination of caffeine. In the 1990s, several fruit-flavored varieties of Diet Rite were introduced. 

In 2000, the line was reformulated yet again, this time to replace aspartame with Splenda brand sucralose and Sunnet brand acesulfame potassium. It became the first major diet soda in the United States to use neither aspartame nor saccharin as a sweetener. In 2005, "Pure Zero" was added to the name, and a cherry cola flavor was introduced in 2006.

Today it is owned by and distributed by Keurig Dr Pepper.

Advertising
In the early 1960s The Paris Sisters sang a jingle for a Diet Rite television commercial, with the line "Stay thin with the best-tasting cola of all!".

References

External links
 

American cola brands
Diet drinks
Keurig Dr Pepper brands
Products introduced in 1958